Palmyra is a station on the River Line light rail system, located on East Broad Street between in Cinnaminson and Highland Avenues in Palmyra, New Jersey, though its official address is on East Broad Street.

The station opened on March 15, 2004. Southbound services go to Camden, New Jersey and northbound services go to the Trenton Transit Center. Palmyra station is located just east of Borough Park and the Palmyra Borough Hall.

Transfers 
New Jersey Transit buses: 419

References

External links

 Station from Cinnaminson Avenue from Google Maps Street View

River Line stations
Railway stations in the United States opened in 2004
2004 establishments in New Jersey
Railway stations in Burlington County, New Jersey
Palmyra, New Jersey